Hotel Majestic is a Nigerian telenovela drama series, starring Ivie Okujaye, Sadiq Daba, Oge Okoye and Bukky Ajayi. It began on Africa Magic on 5 January 2015.

Guide
The writer for the series was Tunde Aladese. The series revolved around the quest to control an ancient family hotel and the consequences that follows with it. The final episode was shown in January 2016, with an event at InterContinental Hotel featuring special performances from Harrysong and YCEE amongst others.

Cast 
 Ivie Okujaye as Alero/Ivie
 Oge Okoye as Patricia
 David Jones David as Timi Emeni
 Kingsley Nwachukwu as Maja Emeni
 Akin Lewis as Honorable Edafe
 Sadiq Daba as Epa John/King John
 Gloria Young as Bene
 'Muyiwa Odukale as Seargent Tony
 Timi Richards as Abdul Asemota

Reception 
The Nollywood Review, praised the storyline, African setting, acting, plot and props. It particularly felt usage of pidgin English was well appreciated and added to the originality of the film. However, it downplayed the acting of "Aunty Ronke" explaining that she didn't add enough life to her role as a mother and was not convincing enough. Pulse Nigeria called it a "suspense filled series", that was the rave of the moment. This Day Newspaper espoused that the casting and screenplay were fundamental to the success of the series.

Awards and nominations

References

External links 
 

2015 Nigerian television series debuts
Nigerian television series
Africa Magic original programming